Bourbaki(s) may refer to :

Persons and science 
 Charles-Denis Bourbaki (1816–1897), French general, son of Constantin Denis Bourbaki
 Colonel Constantin Denis Bourbaki (1787–1827), officer in the Greek War of Independence and serving in the French military
 Nicolas Bourbaki, the collective pseudonym of a group of French mathematicians
 Séminaire Nicolas Bourbaki  and its follow-ups 
 Séminaire Nicolas Bourbaki (1950–1959) 
 Séminaire Nicolas Bourbaki (1960–1969)  
 Bourbaki–Witt theorem 
 Bourbaki–Alaoglu theorem
 Jacobson–Bourbaki theorem
 Nikolaos Bourbakis, computer scientist

Other 
 A place in Algeria, now known as Khemisti, near Aïn-Tourcia and the site of ancient city and former bishopric Columnata
 Bourbaki dangerous bend symbol